Demob usually refers to demobilization, the standing down of military personnel.

Demob may also refer to:
 Demob (TV series), a British comedy-drama
 Demob (band), a punk rock band (since 1978, in various forms), originating in Gloucester, England

See also
 D Mob, producer of house music (since 1988), from Staffordshire, England
 D-Mob, a video game character in Def Jam Vendetta and Def Jam: Fight for NY
 Demobbed (disambiguation)